E.J. Rath is the pseudonym of writer Edith Rathbone Jacobs Brainerd (1885 – January 28, 1922) who was assisted with many of her writing projects by her husband Chauncey Corey Brainerd (April 16, 1874 – January 28, 1922), a Washington D.C. correspondent for the Brooklyn Daily Eagle. Several of her stories were adapted into plays and films.

Life and work

She was from Mount Vernon, New York.

Brainerd was her second husband. They married June 4, 1903.

The story "The Heroism of Mr. Peglow" was published in Everybody's Magazine in December 1907.

The couple were killed along with almost 200 others when the roof of the Knickerbocker Theatre in Washington D.C. collapsed under the weight of heavy snow. The event became known as the Knickerbocker Storm and occurred January 27–28, 1922. Politicians, officials, and fellow newspaper reporters paid tribute. He had attended the Peace Conference in Europe.

The Brooklyn Daily Eagle published a 36-page tribute.

Her book, The Nervous Wreck, was made into the movie The Nervous Wreck in 1926, starring Harrison Ford and Phyllis Haver.

Works
"The Heroism of Mr. Peglow." Busy Man's Magazine, 115–124 (1907)
The Sixth Speed (1908)
Too Much Efficiency (1917)
Mister 44 (1916), adapted into the film Mister 44 (1916)
Sam (1918), adapted into the film The River of Romance
Too Many Crooks (1918), adapted into the film Too Many Crooks
The Mantle of Silence (1920), illustrated by George W. Gage
Good References (1920), adapted into the film Good References (1920) – also trans. as Goede getuigen (Dutch, 1934)?
Note: Rath was killed with her husband in Jan. 1922, but novels under the pseudonym continued to appear.
The Dark Chapter: A Comedy of Class Distinctions (1924), adapted into the film Merrily We Live (1938)
Gas Drive In: a high-powered comedy-romance that hits on every cylinder (1925)
The Brains of the Family (1925)
Elope if You Must (1926) – also trans. as Vlucht in den nacht (Dutch, 1941)?
When the Devil Was Sick (1926)
A Good Indian: a northwoods mixup (1927)
The Brat (1927)
Something for Nothing (1928)
The Stolen Car (1929)
Once Again (1929)
The Riddle of the Wilds (1929)
The Sky's the Limit (1929)
Let's go (1931)
The Flying Courtship
The Nervous Wreck (1931)

Translations
(not clear from the translated titles which English originals these are)
Den stulna kompassen (Swedish, "The Stolen Compass," 1921)
Mannen med nerverna (Swedish, "The Man with the Nerves," 1926)
De innemende landloper (Dutch, "The Endearing Vagrant," 1927)
Charlotte op glad ijs: een dol verhaal (Dutch, "Charlotte on Thin Ice: A crazy story," 1935)
De man in het wagentje (Dutch, "The Man in the Cart," 1935)
Het meisje uit de garage (Dutch, "The Girl from the Garage," 1935)
De chef en de schooljongens (Dutch, "The Chef and the Schoolboys," 1935)
Machtiger dan de sterren (Dutch, "Mightier than the Stars," 1941)
Nu of nooit, trans. Diet Kramer (Dutch, "Now or Never," 19??)

Filmography
Mister 44 (1916)
The River of Romance (1916)
Good References (1920)
The Nervous Wreck (1926), an adaptation of her story of the same name
Too Many Crooks
Clear the Decks (1929)
Whoopee! (1930)
What a Man
Fast Life
Merrily We Live (1938), based on the 1924 novel The Dark Chapter: A Comedy of Class Distinctions by E.J. Rath and the 1926 Broadway adaptation They All Want Something

References

External links

1885 births
1922 deaths
20th-century American novelists
20th-century American screenwriters
20th-century American women writers
American women novelists
American women screenwriters
Novelists from New York (state)
Pseudonymous women writers
Screenwriters from New York (state)
Writers from Mount Vernon, New York
20th-century pseudonymous writers